Galaxy morphological classification is a system used by astronomers to divide galaxies into groups based on their visual appearance. There are several schemes in use by which galaxies can be classified according to their morphologies, the most famous being the Hubble sequence, devised by Edwin Hubble and later expanded by Gérard de Vaucouleurs and Allan Sandage. However, galaxy classification and morphology are now largely done using computational methods and physical morphology.

Hubble sequence 

The Hubble sequence is a morphological classification scheme for galaxies invented by Edwin Hubble in 1926.
It is often known colloquially as the “Hubble tuning-fork” because of the shape in which it is traditionally represented. Hubble's scheme divides galaxies into three broad classes based on their visual appearance (originally on photographic plates):
 Elliptical galaxies have smooth, featureless light distributions and appear as ellipses in images. They are denoted by the letter "E", followed by an integer n representing their degree of ellipticity on the sky. The specific ellipticity rating depends on ratio of the major (a) to minor axes (b), thus:
 
 Spiral galaxies consist of a flattened disk, with stars forming a (usually two-armed) spiral structure, and a central concentration of stars known as the bulge, which is similar in appearance to an elliptical galaxy. They are given the symbol "S". Roughly half of all spirals are also observed to have a bar-like structure, extending from the central bulge. These barred spirals are given the symbol "SB".
 Lenticular galaxies (designated S0) also consist of a bright central bulge surrounded by an extended, disk-like structure but, unlike spiral galaxies, the disks of lenticular galaxies have no visible spiral structure and are not actively forming stars in any significant quantity.

These broad classes can be extended to enable finer distinctions of appearance and to encompass other types of galaxies, such as irregular galaxies, which have no obvious regular structure (either disk-like or ellipsoidal).

The Hubble sequence is often represented in the form of a two-pronged fork, with the ellipticals on the left (with the degree of ellipticity increasing from left to right) and the barred and unbarred spirals forming the two parallel prongs of the fork. Lenticular galaxies are placed between the ellipticals and the spirals, at the point where the two prongs meet the “handle”.

To this day, the Hubble sequence is the most commonly used system for classifying galaxies, both in professional astronomical research and in amateur astronomy.

Nonetheless, in June 2019, citizen scientists through Galaxy Zoo reported that the usual Hubble classification, particularly concerning spiral galaxies, may not be supported, and may need updating.

De Vaucouleurs system 

The de Vaucouleurs system for classifying galaxies is a widely used extension to the Hubble sequence, first described by Gérard de Vaucouleurs in 1959. De Vaucouleurs argued that Hubble's two-dimensional classification of spiral galaxies—based on the tightness of the spiral arms and the presence or absence of a bar—did not adequately describe the full range of observed galaxy morphologies. In particular, he argued that rings and lenses are important structural components of spiral galaxies.

The de Vaucouleurs system retains Hubble's basic division of galaxies into ellipticals, lenticulars, spirals and irregulars. To complement Hubble's scheme, de Vaucouleurs introduced a more elaborate classification system for spiral galaxies, based on three morphological characteristics:

The different elements of the classification scheme are combined — in the order in which they are listed — to give the complete classification of a galaxy. For example, a weakly barred spiral galaxy with loosely wound arms and a ring is denoted SAB(r)c.

Visually, the de Vaucouleurs system can be represented as a three-dimensional version of Hubble's tuning fork, with stage (spiralness) on the x-axis, family (barredness) on the y-axis, and variety (ringedness) on the z-axis.

Numerical Hubble stage
De Vaucouleurs also assigned numerical values to each class of galaxy in his scheme. Values of the numerical Hubble stage T run from −6 to +10, with negative numbers corresponding to early-type galaxies (ellipticals and lenticulars) and positive numbers to late types (spirals and irregulars). Thus, as a rough rule, lower values of T correspond to a larger fraction of the stellar mass contained in a spheroid/bulge relative to the disk. The approximate mapping between the spheroid-to-total stellar mass ratio (MB/MT) and the Hubble stage is MB/MT=(10−T)2/256 based on local galaxies.

Elliptical galaxies are divided into three 'stages': compact ellipticals (cE), normal ellipticals (E) and late types (E+). Lenticulars are similarly subdivided into early (S−), intermediate (S0) and late (S+) types. Irregular galaxies can be of type magellanic irregulars (T = 10) or 'compact' (T = 11).

The use of numerical stages allows for more quantitative studies of galaxy morphology.

Yerkes (or Morgan) scheme 
The Yerkes scheme was created by American astronomer William Wilson Morgan.  Together with Philip Keenan, Morgan also developed the MK system for the classification of stars through their spectra. The Yerkes scheme uses the spectra of stars in the galaxy; the shape, real and apparent; and the degree of the central concentration to classify galaxies.

Thus, for example, the Andromeda Galaxy is classified as kS5.

See also

References

External links 

 Galaxies and the Universe – an introduction to galaxy classification
 Near-Infrared Galaxy Morphology Atlas, T.H. Jarrett
 The Spitzer Infrared Nearby Galaxies Survey (SINGS) Hubble Tuning-Fork, SINGS Spitzer Space Telescope Legacy Science Project
 Go to GalaxyZoo.org to try your hand at classifying galaxies as part of an Oxford University open community project

 
Astronomical classification systems
Extragalactic astronomy
Edwin Hubble